Start-Up Chile is a seed accelerator created by the Chilean government, based in Santiago de Chile. It provides equity free investment for qualified startups.

The program
The program is managed by CORFO, the Chilean Economic Development Agency, via InnovaChile, with the mission of encouraging entrepreneurship and innovation to improve productivity in Chile. Start-Up Chile receives funding from the Ministry of Economy, Development and Tourism, Ministry of Foreign Affairs and Ministry of the Interior.
It launched in 2010, bringing 22 startups from 14 different countries to Chile, providing them with CLP 20,000,000 (Chilean pesos) of equity-free seed capital, and a temporary 1-year visa to develop their projects for six months.
The selected startups join a 24-week program in Santiago where they receive mentoring, office space and access to the most potent social and capital networks in the country. Although the program is open to Chileans, most of the start-ups come from different parts of the world.
 
The scheme's stated objective is to turn Chile into the innovation and entrepreneurship hub of Latin America by attracting the world's best and brightest entrepreneurs to bootstrap their startups in Chile.
By 2011 the goal was bring 300 start-ups to Chile, and was expected to have 1000 by 2014, with the final goal of create a $1b company, and globalize the Chilean entrepreneurship culture. Founders of the program are expected to organize and actively participate in networking events and activities that foster entrepreneurship locally.

Evaluation of results

The entrepreneur participants of Start-Up Chile are measured during their time in the program by indicators that include their participation in local events, presenting workshops on their particular expertise, raising local or international capital, and contracting talent.

See also

 Angel investor
 Venture capital financing
 CORFO

References

External links
 

Economy of Chile
Business incubators